The .600 Nitro Express is a large bore Nitro Express rifle cartridge developed by W.J. Jeffery & Co for the purpose of hunting large game such as elephant.

Design
The .600 Nitro Express is a slightly tapered walled, rimmed, centerfire rifle cartridge designed for use in single-shot and double rifles.

Dimensions

History
The .600 Nitro Express was developed by London gunmakers W.J. Jeffery & Co. Sources vary about the date of its introduction, although it would seem in 1900 the first .600 Nitro Express rifle was produced by W.J. Jeffery & Co, a  double barrelled hammer rifle. Jefferys produced around seventy rifles in .600 Nitro Express in four actions, double barrelled hammer break-open, single barrelled break-open, falling block and double barrelled break-open with and without ejectors.

Until the introduction of the .700 Nitro Express in 1988, the .600 Nitro Express was the most powerful commercially available hunting rifle cartridge in the world. Aside from W.J. Jeffery & Co, several gunmakers have and continue to offer rifles chambering this .600 Nitro Express, although in 2009 it was estimated by Holland & Holland that only around one hundred .600 Nitro Express rifles had ever been produced to that time.

WWI service
In 1914 and early 1915, German snipers were engaging British Army positions with impunity from behind steel plates that were impervious to .303 British ball ammunition. In an attempt to counter this threat, the British War Office purchased sixty-two large-bore sporting rifles from British rifle makers, including four .600 Nitro Express rifles, which were issued to regiments. These large-bore rifles proved very effective against the steel plates used by the Germans. In his book, Sniping in France 1914-18, Major H. Hesketh-Prichard, DSO, MC stated they "pierced them like butter".

Stuart Cloete, sniping officer for the King's Own Yorkshire Light Infantry, stated "We used a heavy sporting rifle - a .600 Express. These had been donated to the army by big game hunters and when we hit a plate we stove it right in. But it had to be fired standing or from a kneeling position to take up the recoil. The first man who fired it from the prone position had his collar bone broken."

Use
The .600 Nitro Express, along with the .577 Nitro Express, was a specialist backup weapon for professional elephant hunters. Too heavy to be carried all day and used effectively, it was usually carried by a gun bearer. It was used when in thick cover and when an effective shot at the heart and lungs was not possible.

In his African Rifles and Cartridges, John "Pondoro" Taylor says the shock of a head shot from a .600 Nitro Express bullet is enough to knock out an elephant for up to half an hour.

Prominent users
He states he was very fond of his Jeffery .600 which he used as a second backup rifle to a .400 Jeffery Nitro Express, and with it he killed between 60 and 70 elephants.

Bror von Blixen-Finecke, Karl Larsen and Major Percy Powell-Cotton all used W.J. Jeffery & Co .600 Nitro Express rifles extensively.

Parent case
In 1929 Holland & Holland produced the .600/577 Rewa by necking down the .600 Nitro Express to accept a  bullet.

The .50 British ammunition used in the Vickers .50 machine gun was initially a necked-down .600 NE.

In popular culture
In the 1997 film The Lost World: Jurassic Park the character Roland Tembo carries a Searcy Double Barrel Rifle chambered in .600 Nitro Express.

Notes

See also
 13 mm caliber and over
 List of rifle cartridges
 Pfeifer Zeliska .600 Nitro Express revolver

References

External links

 Ammo-One, ".600 Nitro Express", ammo-one.com , retrieved 14 September 2017.
 Cartridgecollector, ".600 Nitro Express", cartridgecollector.net, retrieved 14 September 2017.

Pistol and rifle cartridges
British firearm cartridges
Military cartridges
W.J. Jeffery & Co cartridges